The New Zealand Census of Population and Dwellings is a national population and housing census conducted by government department Statistics New Zealand every five years. There have been 34 censuses since 1851. In addition to providing detailed information about national demographics, the results of the census play an important part in the calculation of resource allocation to local service providers.

The 2018 census took place on Tuesday 6 March 2018. The next census is scheduled to take place on 7 March 2023.

Census date
Since 1926, the census has always been held on a Tuesday and since 1966, the census always occurs in March. These are statistically the month and weekday on which New Zealanders are least likely to be travelling. The census forms have to be returned by midnight on census day for them to be valid.

Conducting the census
Until 2018, census forms were hand-delivered by census workers during the lead-in to the census, with one form per person and a special form with questions about the dwelling. In addition, teams of census workers attempt to cover all hospitals, camp grounds, workplaces and transport systems where people might be found at midnight.

In 2018, the process was different. The majority of households received an access code in the post and were encouraged to complete their census online. If preferred, households could request paper census forms. 

The smallest geographic unit used in the census for population data is the mesh block, which there are 53,589 of, with an average of 88 people in each.

The 2023 census can be completed online or on paper forms. Forms with an access code were mailed out to householders from 20 February, but paper forms can be requested online or by telephone (free call 0800 CENSUS (0800 236-787)).

Data collected

The 2018 census collected data on the following topics:

Population structure
Location
Culture and Identity
Education and training
Work
Income
Families and households
Housing
Transport
Health and disability

* Required to be included under the Statistics Act 1975 or the Electoral Act 1993

History
The first full census in New Zealand was conducted in 1851, and the census was triennial until 1881, at which time it became five-yearly. The 1931 census was cancelled due to the effects of the Great Depression, as was the 1941 census due to World War II.

1951 was the first year in which Māori and European New Zealanders were treated equally, with European New Zealanders having had a different census form in previous years and separate censuses in the nineteenth century. Results for those censuses before 1966 have been destroyed with a few exceptions and those since will not be available before 2066.

The 2006 census was held on Tuesday, 7 March. For the first time, respondents had the option of completing their census form online rather than by a printed form.

The 2011 census was scheduled for Tuesday, 8 March. However, due to the Christchurch earthquake on 22 February 2011, it was cancelled. For the first time ever, all 2011 census forms would have been digitally archived. On 27 May 2011 Statistics New Zealand announced that a census would take place in March 2013. The legislation required to change the census date was introduced to Parliament in August 2011.

The 2013 census was held on Tuesday 5 March 2013 and the 2018 census was held on Tuesday 6 March 2018. The 2018 census faced wide criticism for low response rates, a poor rollout of the online component of the census and delays. This resulted in a independent review of the census process, and the resignation of the then-Chief Executive of Statistics New Zealand Liz MacPherson.

The 2023 census is currently scheduled for Tuesday, 7 March, and it will be implementing measures that aim to increase the Census' effectiveness in response to the issues faced with the 2018 census, including supporting Māori to complete the census. It will also include new questions on topics such as gender, sexual identity, and disabilities/health conditions. However, it may be delayed due to the effects of Cyclone Gabrielle.

Evasion of the census
A few people object to the census and attempt to evade it. The most famous of these is The Wizard of New Zealand, Ian Brackenbury Channell, who has avoided the census on numerous occasions. He spent the night of the 1981 census in a boat beyond New Zealand's  territorial limit in order to avoid enumeration in the country. He has also publicly burnt census forms.

Following the 2006 census, Statistics New Zealand prosecuted 72 people for failing to return their forms, with 41 convictions. After the 2013 census, they wrote to 450 people in July 2013 who had failed to return the forms, of whom 99 were prosecuted, resulting in 46 convictions. Most of those convicted faced two charges and were fined $50 to $500 per charge.

Results

Results of the 2013 census were released over an 18-month period, beginning 15 October 2013. It recorded 4,242,048 people who were resident in New Zealand on 5 March 2013. This represents an increase of 214,101 people (5.3 percent) since the 2006 census.

Results from the 2018 census were released to the public on 23 September 2019. The population of New Zealand was counted as 4,699,755 – an increase of 457,707 (10.79%) over the 2013 census.

Notes

References

External links
Statistics New Zealand - census page
New Zealand 2013 Census